Egypt is an American populated place in Shelby County, Tennessee at . Joseph B. Adkison, a recipient of the Medal of Honor for his actions in World War I, was from Egypt.

References

populated places in Shelby County, Tennessee